Kumanovo had some sporting life before Second World War. After the war there is intensity in sport development. Socialist syndicate organizations and their "massive sporting culture" lead to results in sports and higher educated gym professors.

Football in Kumanovo
The most notable football club in Kumanovo after second World War was FK "11 Oktomvri". Later through the clubs "Dinamo" and "Edinstvo" transformed itself into "Kumanovo" that we know today. FK Kumanovo was champion of Macedonian Football League in 1971.

Basketball in Kumanovo

KK Kumanovo is a basketball team who competes in the first Macedonian First League, Balkan International Basketball League. Since 2015 the Team competes in the newly formed Europe Cup.

Handball in Kumanovo
RK Kumanovo -Shevro represented Kumanovo in EHF 1993/94 Men's Cup Winners' Cup.

Boxing in Kumanovo
Kumanovo have 2 medals from the Olympic Games. Redzep Redzepovski silver medal in Los Angeles 1984 and Ace Rusevski in Montreal 1976. Rusevski also has a European champion medal from 1977.

Other Sports

See also
FK Kumanovo
KK Kumanovo Men's Basketball club
RK Kumanovo Men's Handball club
Sports Hall Kumanovo
Sports Hall Sokolana

References

External links
EHF Men's Cup Winners Cup 1993-94, 1/8-Finals RESULTS (English)